Gynacantha mexicana, the bar-sided darner, is a species of darner in the dragonfly family Aeshnidae. It is found in Central America, North America, and South America.

The IUCN conservation status of Gynacantha mexicana is "LC", least concern, with no immediate threat to the species' survival. The population is stable. The IUCN status was reviewed in 2017.

References

Further reading

 

Aeshnidae
Articles created by Qbugbot
Insects described in 1868